Nalaki may refer to:
 Nalaki, Sistan and Baluchestan (نلكي - Nalakī)